Ingrid Bethke (born 1941) is a former German model and beauty queen. Elected Miss Germany in 1965, she went on to represent the country at the Miss Universe competition that year, where she was awarded Miss Congeniality. She also appeared in two films Street Acquaintances of St. Pauli (1968) and The Body in the Thames (1971).

References

Bibliography 
 Peter Cowie. World Filmography, 1968. Tantivy Press, 1977.

1941 births
Living people
German film actresses
Models from Berlin
Miss Universe 1965 contestants